Syed Mahibul Hasan was a Bangladeshi politician. He served as a Member of Parliament from the former Sylhet-16 constituency and later joined the Bangladesh Nationalist Party, serving as a minister under President Ziaur Rahman.

Early life and family
Hasan was born into a Bengali Muslim family of Syeds in Narapati Haveli (uttar) in Chunarughat, Habiganj (then under Sylhet district). His paternal family trace their lineage to Ali, the fourth Caliph of Islam.

Career
Hasan stood as a Muslim League candidate during an election in 1964 where he successfully won a seat in the East Pakistan Provincial Assembly. During the 1970 East Pakistan Provincial Assembly election, he contested as an independent candidate, losing to Awami League politician Manik Chowdhury.

He competed in the 1979 Bangladeshi general election as an independent candidate, winning a seat in the Sylhet-16 constituency. He later joined the Bangladesh Nationalist Party and served as the Minister of Labour in the cabinet of President Ziaur Rahman. During the presidency of Abdus Sattar, Hasan served as the Minister of Industries and Commerce. In the 1986 Bangladeshi general election, he independently contested for the Habiganj-3 constituency but lost to National Awami Party politician Chowdhury Abdul Hai. Hasan later joined the Jatiya Party, but retired from politics following the 1990 Mass Uprising.

Personal life
Hasan was married to Suraiya Hasan and they had one son and one daughter. Their daughter, Syeda Rizwana Hasan, is a lawyer and environmentalist.

References

Bangladesh Nationalist Party politicians
2nd Jatiya Sangsad members
Year of birth missing
People from Chunarughat Upazila
Bangladeshi people of Arab descent
20th-century Bengalis
Pakistan Muslim League politicians